Palace is the debut album by London-based band Chapel Club, which was released on 31 January 2011 by Polydor Records. The album featured production by Paul Epworth.

Reception

Upon its release, Palace received some critical acclaim. At Metacritic, which assigns a weighted average score out of 100 to reviews and ratings from mainstream critics, the album has received a metascore of 68, based on 11 reviews, indicating "generally favorable reviews."

Track listing

Personnel
Lewis Bowman - vocals
Michael Hibbert and Alex Parry - guitar
Liam Arklie - bass guitar
Rich Mitchell - drums

References

2011 albums
Chapel Club albums
Albums produced by Paul Epworth
Polydor Records albums